This is an overview of the regular, recurring, and other characters of the TV series The Last Ship.

Overview

Main characters

Tom Chandler
 If courage had a face, it would be identical to the face of Tom Chandler.

Rachel Scott

Dr. Rachel Scott, M.D., Ph.D. was the leading paleomicrobiologist aboard the USS Nathan James (DDG-151) alongside Doctor Quincy Tophet. She worked for the Centers for Disease Control and Prevention and the World Health Organization to create a cure for the virus that had wiped out most of the human race. Little is known about her personal life, however it was confirmed that she had a boyfriend whose fate was unknown; furthermore, she and Tex had a very close relationship. In the Season 2 finale she was shot dead after finding a way to spread the cure by person-to-person contact. In Season 3 she was on a stamp in a ration books as a way to remember her commitment. As well, Scott's efforts to create the "contagious cure" as it was called succeeded in stopping the pandemic. Her killer is later revealed to have been arrested and imprisoned for her murder. In the series finale, she reappears briefly when Chandler sees everyone he has lost along the way following the sinking of the Nathan James. She was portrayed by Rhona Mitra.

Accord to her Department of the Navy personnel file, Scott was a British citizen with US permanent resident status who was born in London, England. She had attended the University of Oxford (mistakenly listed as Oxford University) and was awarded a BS in chemistry, with honors, in 1999. Four years later, she received her MD degree by the University of Cambridge (mistakenly listed as Cambridge University). Later, she went to America to receive PhDs from Yale University in the fields of virology (in 2005) and public health (in 2007) followed by jobs at the World Health Organization (2007–2008), Doctors Without Borders (2008–2010), and the Centers for Disease Control (2010-)

Mike Slattery

Admiral Michael "Mike" Slattery is the former executive officer and captain of the USS Nathan James (DDG-151) who now serves as Chief of Naval Operations.  He is portrayed by Adam Baldwin.

Biography
Originally from Chicago, Mike Slattery is a former homicide detective with the Chicago Police Department (during which time he was presumably a member of the United States Navy Reserve).  He is married to Christine Slattery (Ele Keats), with whom he has three children, two daughters and a son, Lucas.

By 2014, Slattery held the rank of commander in the United States Navy and was the executive officer of the Arleigh Burke-class guided missile destroyer USS Nathan James (DDG-151).  That year, the Nathan James took on paleomicrobiologists Dr. Rachel Scott (Rhona Mitra) and Dr. Quincy Tophet (Sam Spruell) as the Nathan James conducted operations in the Arctic region. However, their mission, unknown to even them, was just a cover for Drs. Scott and Tophet, who were actually collecting samples of a deadly virus that has infected 80 percent of the human population while they have been at sea, including his own son, Lucas.

When CDR Chandler was promoted to Chief of Naval Operations after the defeat of the Immunes and the successful creation of the "contagious cure" by Dr. Scott, Slattery was promoted to the rank of Captain and named commanding officer of the Nathan James.

In Season 5, Slattery was promoted to admiral and made Chief of Naval Operations.

Awards and decorations
The following are the medals and service awards fictionally worn by ADM Slattery.

Russ Jeter

Russell "Russ" Jeter is the current Master Chief Petty Officer of the Navy. He previously served as the senior enlisted advisor of the USS Nathan James (DDG-151).  He is portrayed by Charles Parnell.

Biography
The oldest member of the Nathan James crew, CMC Russ Jeter is a decorated chief petty officer with over 20 years of service in the United States Navy (in one episode, CMC Jeter mentions that he has served under six Presidents of the United States, indicating that he has been in the Navy since the 1980s).  In addition to his role as the ship's senior enlisted advisor, CMC Jeter also serves as the ship's de facto chaplain, leading religious services onboard and presiding over burials at sea.

His wife and children were killed in a car crash while he was driving; although he was found not culpable for the accident, he still suffers from survivor's guilt to this day.

In Season 5, Jeter was promoted to Master Chief Petty Officer of the Navy.

Awards and decorations
The following are the medals and service awards fictionally worn by MCPON Jeter.

Quincy Tophet
Dr. Quincy Tophet was a paleomicrobiologist. In season 1 he was a mole for the Russians due to the fact they were holding his family captive. He was shot in the season 1 finale and allowed himself to be killed rather than reveal the location of the cure.  He was portrayed by Sam Spruell.

Danny Green

Lieutenant Daniel Joshua "Danny" Green is the leader of the Naval Mountain Warfare Unit attached to the USS Nathan James (DDG-151). He eventually marries Kara Green and has a son with her. He is portrayed by Travis Van Winkle.

Awards and decorations
The following are the medals and service awards fictionally worn by LT Green.

LT Green received his third Bronze Star for his actions during the Red Flu crisis.

Kara Green (née Foster)

Commander Kara Green (née Foster) is the current commanding officer of the USS Nathan James (DDG-151).  She is portrayed by Marissa Neitling.

Biography
Kara was born circa 1988 and grew up in Rose Hill, Kansas.  Her mother, Debbie, is a recovering alcoholic who has been sober since the outbreak of the Red Flu.

After graduating from high school, Kara joined the Navy.  By 2014, she was serving as an officer in the Combat Information Center on the USS Nathan James (DDG-151).  During the ship's mission to the Arctic, she began dating and fell in love with LT Danny Green (Travis Van Winkle), the leader of the Naval Mountain Warfare Unit deployed on the James.  In "Trials", Kara learns that she's pregnant, and that her child will be born immune to the Red Flu because of its mother's vaccination.

After the death of LCDR Barker at the hands of Amy Granderson's (Alfre Woodard) rogue Maryland State Troopers, Kara is made Tactical Actions Officer of the Nathan James and is given special dispensation by the captain to remain at sea, despite regulations stating that all pregnant officers and sailors be reassigned to shore duty.

In "A More Perfect Union", Danny proposes to Kara and by "The Scott Effect", they are married and Kara has given birth to a son, Frankie Green. In addition to being a new wife and mother, Kara has left active duty and works for Captain Chandler and the Michener Administration as a Deputy Chief of Staff for military (specifically naval) matters. Although most of the characters in the St. Louis White House referred to her as "Mrs. Green", Secretary Rivera sometimes addressed her as "Commander Green".

In the first episode of season four, Kara wore the Navy Service Khaki uniform with the insignia of a Lieutenant Commander while being assigned to the U.S. Naval Station Rota in Spain.  After the attack on the base and the injury of LCDR Cameron Burk, Kara returns to duty as the Tactical Actions Officer on the Nathan James. In the season four finale, Kara plays a crucial role in the defeat of Vellek, using the Nathan James Close-In Weapons System to gun down the HS Triton's bridge crew, commanding officer and defending gunners, giving a boarding party a chance to take the ship.

In Season 5, Kara was promoted to Commander and initially given temporary command of the Nathan James for Fleet Week prior to a planned return to shore duty.

Awards and decorations
The following are the medals and service awards fictionally worn by CDR Green.

Alisha Granderson
Lieutenant Commander Alisha Granderson is a junior officer on the USS Nathan James (DDG-151), originally serving as an officer of the deck.  As the series progresses, she is given more responsibility and trust by the senior staff, culminating in a temporary appointment as executive officer of the Nathan James while CDR Garnett (Fay Masterson) is MIA.  She is portrayed by Christina Elmore.

Her mother, Amy Granderson (Alfre Woodard), was the vice-chair of the President's Defense Policy Board at the time of the Red Flu outbreak, and was believed to be the highest-ranking member of the White House to survive the immediate pandemic.  After her genocide in Baltimore is stopped by CDR Chandler and the Nathan James retaken from her rogue Maryland State Police Troopers, Amy committed suicide rather than surrender, leaving Alisha devastated.

In Season 5, Granderson was promoted to Lieutenant Commander and assigned to Naval Station Mayport under Admiral Joseph Meylan. At the end of Season 5's fourth episode, "Tropic of Cancer", Granderson was stabbed in her home by her girlfriend upon discovering she had used Granderson as a tool to aid Gustavo Barros' cause (the text she sent to Granderson as she passed through a security checkpoint acted as a gateway for the computer virus to enter the US Government's network). It is safely assumed, though not definite, that Granderson died as a result of this injury; in later episodes, numerous characters suggest that Granderson is indeed dead as a result of her wounds.

Awards and decorations
The following are the medals and service awards fictionally worn by LCDR Granderson.

Tex Nolan
Ken "Tex" Nolan is a private security contractor who met the crew of the USS Nathan James (DDG-151) at Guantanamo Bay Naval Base. After working with him to defuse an enemy threat at the base, Commander Tom Chandler invited him to join them on their mission to create a vaccine for the virus. Before joining the private sector, Tex served in the United States Army Special Forces. He is portrayed by John Pyper-Ferguson.

In "A More Perfect Union", Tex departs the ship to search for his ex-wife and daughter, last seen in Jackson, Mississippi. He locates the place they were staying and finds out that his wife was killed by looters but his daughter, Kathleen (Jade Chynoweth) survived and is heading for where the Nathan James is spreading the cure. Tex goes after her, learning from an infected man (who he cures) that the Immunes are planning on exposing innocent people to the virus to destroy the people's trust in the Navy. Tex reunites with his daughter and teams up with a team from the Nathan James in Memphis, Tennessee to stop the Immunes. He succeeds, and in St. Louis introduces Dr. Scott to his daughter while helping pass around the cure.

After the death of Dr. Scott, Tex and his daughter found work with Roberta Price (Lucy Butler), the regional leader of the Deep South.  However, when he learned that the private security contractors he was training were being used by Price as her own personal private army, he tried to leave and was captured.  He escaped from Price's custody, and he and Kathleen eventually made their way to Kara Green and Jacob Scott, and helped them extract President Oliver (John Cothran) from the Chief of Staff, Allison Shaw (Elisabeth Röhm), and the other regional leaders who wanted him to dissolve the country.

Now with President Oliver, Kara, and Kathleen, Tex is declared a fugitive by Shaw and the leaders as they make their way to San Diego to rendezvous with the Nathan James, which was coming back from Asia. Together, they took down Manuel Castillo, California's regional leader.

After CAPT Chandler's children were kidnapped by Shaw, Tex went in as backup for the hostage swap and subsequently killed her guards; however, he lost his own life in the process, leaving behind a grief-stricken daughter.

In the series finale, Tex reappears when the now-Admiral Chandler has a near-death experience following the sinking of the Nathan James. Tex encourages Chandler to return to the land of the living and shows Chandler how everyone sees him.

Carlton Burk
Commander Carlton Burk is the former head of the Nathan James VBSS teams. He is LCdr. Cameron Burk's younger brother (recurring season 1; starring season 2–present). He is portrayed by Jocko Sims.

In Season 5, he is promoted to executive officer of the Nathan James.

In Season 5, episode "Courage", he is killed after being impaled by an harpoon to the chest raiding one of Tavo's patrol boats.

Eric Miller
Chief Gunner's Mate Eric Miller, is a member of the ship's VBSS teams. (recurring season 1–2, starring season 3-5). Wounded in Action in the episode "Somos la Sangre".(Season 5) He is portrayed by Kevin Michael Martin.

Awards and decorations
The following are the medals and service awards fictionally worn by GMC Miller.

Wolf Taylor
Senior Chief Petty Officer Wolf Taylor is a member of the Royal Australian Navy's CDT 3 (Special Forces). He was stationed on a military exchange program in Norfolk, Virginia alongside Lt. Ravit Bivas of the IDF during the outbreak of the Red Flu. He later joins the team aboard the USS Nathan James (DDG-151) under the command of Commander Tom Chandler after the ship arrives in Norfolk. In the series finale, he is severely wounded while during the invasion of Colombia. His ultimate fate is unknown, but he was last seen alive and being taken away on a stretcher. He is portrayed by Bren Foster.

Sasha Cooper
A former operative with the Office of Naval Intelligence, Sasha Cooper and Tom Chandler have a long personal and professional past with each other. She is introduced as an intelligence agent for the newly reformed United States government, operating undercover as a diplomat in China. She later joins the team aboard the USS Nathan James. She is portrayed by Bridget Regan.

Cameron Burk
Lieutenant Commander  Cameron Burk, is the older brother of CDR Carlton Burk and the new Tactical Actions Officer (and third-in-command behind the Captain and XO) of the USS Nathan James during Season 3.  In "In Medias Res", LCDR Burk is wounded in action on an attack on the naval base in Rota, Spain, and flown to Germany for medical treatment. He is portrayed by LaMonica Garrett.

Joseph Meylan
Admiral Joseph Meylan is the former commanding officer of the USS Hayward, who joins the USS Nathan James after his ship was severely damaged by the Chinese Navy and has to be stripped of all usable parts and scuttled. He is portrayed by Emerson Brooks. The loss of his ship deeply affects Meylan who reveals that he had been a plank holder who had aided in constructing his ship. Meylan is unable to bring himself to detonate the scuttling charges, so Captain Chandler does it for him. Meylan briefly takes command of the Nathan James in S03E10 after he is ordered by the St. Louis White House to place Captain Chandler under arrest and relieve Captain Slattery of his command of the ship. He loses his command at the end of the episode after a team of Nathan James sailors led by Slattery gain access to the ship's armory and sequester sailors aligned with Meylan, including Meylan himself. However, at his own request, Meylan is released to aid in fighting the Chinese forces, sharing command of the ship with Andrea Garnett while both Chandler and Slattery are off of the ship. Meylan's leadership during the battle earns him the respect and trust of the Nathan James crew while Meylan comes to realize that they're right about Allison Shaw's coup. As a result, Meylan becomes a trusted member of the Nathan James crew, fighting alongside them to take down Shaw and her forces.

In Season 4, he replaces Andrea Garnett as the executive officer of USS Nathan James under Captain Mike Slattery. During the battle with the Greek Navy, Meylan works with Chandler and Slattery to outfight the enemy fleet. Meylan comes up with what he dubs the Meylan Maneuver which lures out one of the enemy ships and destroys it. Meylan's experience as an engineer later comes in handy in directing Chandler and Sasha Cooper in how to sabotage the HS Triton. Once the ship is crippled, Meylan joins the boarding party that storms the Triton for the cure to the Red Rust.

In Season 5, Meylan was promoted to Admiral and assigned to Naval Station Mayport. In the episode, "Honor" of Season 5, Meylan is killed while protecting President Joshua Reiss.

Awards and decorations
The following are the medals and service awards fictionally worn by Meylan.

Recurring characters

USS Nathan James personnel

Andrea Garnett
Captain Andrea Garnett is the former chief engineer and executive officer of the USS Nathan James (DDG-151).  LCDR Garnett is initially third in the chain of command on the ship, behind the Captain and XO. At the beginning of Season 3, she is promoted to full Commander and is Captain Slattery's replacement as executive officer of the Nathan James. She was captured by Japanese pirates and held as a P.O.W. along with several other crew members of the USS Nathan James, but has now been rescued. She lost her husband and children during the Red Flu crisis. She is portrayed by Fay Masterson.

Garnett did not appear in the fourth season and was replaced as executive officer by Captain Joseph Meylan (Emerson Brooks). It was explained in the first episode of the fourth season that Meylan was waiting for a new ship to command, but replacement ships were not being recommissioned due to budgetary constraints. No explanation for Garnett's absence during Season 4 is given. However, she helps from behind the scenes in a couple of episodes, aiding the crew in procuring a new plane after their old one was blown up and providing vital intelligence on Paul Vellick's movements, allowing the Nathan James to foil Vellick's plan to spread the Nostos drug.

In Season 5, Garnett was promoted to the rank of Captain and given command of the multipurpose amphibious assault ship USS Jeffrey Michener (LHD-81), the fleet flagship for Admiral Slattery.  She was killed during the attack on Fleet Week.

Awards and decorations
The following are the medals and service awards fictionally worn by CAPT Garnett.

Rios
Chief Hospital Corpsman "Doc" Rios is the independent duty corpsman assigned to the USS Nathan James (DDG-151). He is portrayed by Maximiliano Hernández.

In Season 3, he is promoted to Ensign in the US Navy Medical Corps and made Chief Medical Officer of the Nathan James. He was captured by pirates as a P.O.W. before being rescued. Following the rescue, Rios is assigned to figure out why the cure to the Red Flu is no longer working and he discovers the true nature of Peng's anti-cure.

In Season 5, Rios was promoted to Lieutenant. He was killed during the attack on Fleet Week while tending to a wounded CAPT Garnett.

Awards and decorations
The following are the medals and service awards fictionally worn by LT Rios.

Carl Nishioka
A member of the USS Nathan James (DDG-151)'s combat information center, Petty Officer First Class Carl Nishioka served as a Fire Controlman.  He was promoted to Chief Petty Officer in Season 3. In Season 4's "Endgame," he joins a makeshift boarding party formed by Slattery after the ship's away team is too far away to help in time. He is portrayed by Ben Cho.

In Season 5, Nishioka was commissioned as an Operations Technician Chief Warrant Officer 2 and was serving as Tactical Actions Officer on Nathan James.

Awards and decorations
The following are the medals and service awards fictionally worn by CWO2 Nishioka.

Others
 Lieutenant Commander Barker, USN (KIA, 2015) (Jamison Haase) – Tactical Actions Officer; killed during the siege of the Nathan James
 Lieutenant Commander Juan "Gator" Mejia, USN (Michael Curran-Dorsano) – Navigator
 Lieutenant  Ravit Bivas, IDF (KIA, 2015) (Inbar Lavi) – Member of the United States Naval Special Warfare Command Joint Operations Training Program; joined crew in Norfolk; killed in action during the oil rig attack
 Lieutenant, junior grade Andrew "Andy" Chung, USN (KIA, 2015) (Andy T. Tran) – Main Propulsion Assistant (MPA); killed in action during the oil rig attack
 Lieutenant, junior grade Will Mason, USN (KIA, 2016) (Chris Sheffield): Sonar Officer (2015–2016); former Communications Officer (2014–2015)
 Chief Warrant Officer 3 Rodney "Sunshine" Poynter, USN (KIA, 2017) (Wiley M. Pickett): An experienced helicopter pilot. He joins the crew of the Nathan James in Season 4. In the season finale, he is mortally wounded by fire from the HS Triton and orders Kathleen Nolan to jump from the helicopter before giving her the call sign of Cupid. He is killed in the crash, but Kathleen is rescued by the returning away team.
 Senior Chief Petty Officer Lynn, USN (KIA, 2015) (Chris Marrs) – Engineer; killed in action during the oil rig attack
 Chief Culinary Specialist Bernie "Bacon" Cowley, USN (Amen Igbinosun) – Ship's cook; he previously served a tour of duty at Camp David attached to the Presidential Food Service, but transferred to the Nathan James because he needs time at sea to qualify for a promotion.
 Chief Gas Turbine System Technician Michael O'Connor, USN (Paul James): He is a member of the ship's engineering team. In Season 3, he was transferred to the USS Shackleton and then later to the USS Hayward. He rejoined the Nathan James after the Hayward was critically damaged. He was killed in action in "Tempest". In season 5, one of the newly-built ships of the US Navy is named the USS Michael O'Connor after him. However, it is destroyed in the Fleet Week attack.
 Master-at-Arms First Class Javier Cruz, USN (KIA, 2016) (Ness Bautista): The second-in-command of the Nathan James VBSS teams, subordinate to LT Burk.  He is killed during the rescue for the missing crew members. In season 5, one of the newly-built ships of the US Navy is named the USS Javier Cruz after him. However, it is destroyed in the Fleet Week attack.
 Hospital Corpsman First Class Heggen, USN (KIA, 2017) (Ben Turner Dixon) – Corpsman
 Sergeant Azima Kandie, Kenya Navy – Member of the visit, board, search, and seizure teams.
 Petty Officer Third Class Cossetti, USN (KIA, 2014) (Tommy Savas) – Member of the visit, board, search, and seizure teams.  He was killed in action rescuing CDR Chandler and Tex Nolan from the Russian vessel.
 Petty Officer Third Class Maya Gibson, USN (d. 2014) (Felisha Cooper): She is the only person killed during the voluntary human trials.  CDR Chandler nominates her for the Navy Cross.
 Boatswain's Mate Third Class Ray Diaz, USN (Adam Irigoyen): A 17-year-old kid from Florida who was the leader of a group of teenagers surviving on their own in the Everglades. He was rescued by the Nathan James in "Uneasy Lies the Head".  In Season 3, it is revealed that he had successfully enlisted in the Navy (having been denied a position on the ship earlier for his age) and is now a Seaman Apprentice assigned to work under GM2 Eric Miller. Was captured by pirates as a P.O.W. He has now been rescued. In Season 4, he becomes the helmsman and is promoted to Petty Officer Third Class.
 Naval Aircrewman Third Class Kathleen Nolan, USN (Jade Chynoweth): Tex's daughter.  She was reunited with her father in "A More Perfect Union". In Season 4, she enlists in the Navy as a helo gunner. In "Endgame," she is given the call sign of Cupid.
 Wright, USN (Cameron Fuller): An electronic warfare officer on the ship.
 Dalia Jaffe, USN (Hina Abdullah): An electronic warfare officer on the ship.
 Walker, USN (KIA, 2015) (Cody Arbuckle): Crewmember who was killed in action during the oil rig attack.
 Berchem, USN (KIA, 2014) (Andrew Arrabito): A member of the ship's VBSS teams. Killed by the Russians in Cuba.
 Smith, USN (KIA, 2014) (David Paul Olsen): A member of the ship's VBSS teams. Killed by the Russians in Cuba.
 Lieutenant Jackie Makena, USN (Michaela McManus): Originally cast to be a member of the ship's Combat Information Center.  She appears briefly standing next to LTJG Andy Chung during Frankie Benz's funeral in S01E01 "Phase Six".  Her name can be seen on an officer's mug in S02E04 "Solace".

United States government

Amy Granderson
Vice-chair of the U.S. President's Defense Policy Board. She is the highest-ranking member of the White House known to be alive at the end of Season 1, and is LTJG Alisha Granderson's mother.  She is revealed to be killing the people infected with the virus and burning their bodies to power the city of Baltimore, intent that only the "proper" people survive to aid humanity. She and her rogue Maryland State Police bodyguards, as well as her council are vaccinated before that knowledge is known to the Nathan James crew.  Maryland State Troopers capture the Nathan James and hold Slattery and the crew hostage, killing a couple of crew and leaving Quincy with a life-threatening injury. She chooses to kill herself rather than surrender to Chandler after his crew manages to retake the ship.

She is portrayed by Alfre Woodard.

Jeffrey Michener

Jeffrey Allen "Jeff" Michener (died 2016) was the former United States Secretary of Housing and Urban Development. Immune to the Red Flu, Michener is the sole surviving member of the Cabinet of the United States, which makes him next in the presidential line of succession. In "A More Perfect Union", he was officially sworn in as President of the United States in St. Louis, Missouri, by a surviving judge.  He is portrayed by Mark Moses.

Prior to the outbreak of the Red Flu, Michener served as the Secretary of Housing and Urban Development. When the outbreak began, the president sent Michener to Tallahassee, Florida to set up a safe zone in Doak Campbell Stadium. During this time, he had his son flown in from Michigan to be with the family. Unbeknownst to Michener, his son had contracted the virus while in Michigan, thus creating an outbreak of the virus in the stadium. After his son's death, his wife begged him to smother their two daughters before the virus fully incapacitated them. Michener obliged.

After the death of his family, Michener wandered around Florida trying to expose himself to sick people in the hopes of catching a different strand of the virus. Eventually, he ran into a group of Immunes who took him into their group. It was around this time that he was introduced to the Ramsey brothers, who planned to use him as a political puppet in order to gain control of the United States. Michener was rescued in "Alone and Unafraid" by CDR Chandler, LT Burk, and Lt. Bivas inside the Ramsey's compound in Florida.

While on board the Nathan James and suffering from survivor's guilt, Michener slit his wrists in a suicide attempt.  After being freed from the Ramseys' brainwashing, Michener became a staunch ally and supporter of the Nathan James and its crew, helping the American public gain back the trust the ship needed in order to spread the cure.

After the defeat of the Immunes and the successful creation of the "contagious cure" by Dr. Rachel Scott, Michener is sworn in as President of the United States by a surviving judge in St. Louis.  One of Michener's first official acts as President is to issue pardons to the Immunes who got swept up in the Ramsey brothers' campaign, as well as to Dr. Scott, who intentionally killed Niels Sørensen in order to create the contagious cure; he also promoted CDR Chandler to Chief of Naval Operations while the Nathan James is in drydock.

Over the next few months, President Michener set up a new federal government based out of the Old Courthouse in St. Louis, which he named the new capital of the United States.  He appointed St. Louis Mayor Howard Oliver (John Cothran) as his Vice President, Allison Shaw (Elisabeth Röhm) as his Chief of Staff, and Alex Rivera (Nestor Serrano) as his Secretary of Foreign Affairs; CAPT Chandler, as Chief of Naval Operations, also served as Michener's de facto military commander in lieu of an official Secretary of Defense.

In the episode "In the Dark," reporter Jacob Barnes reveals to the public that President Michener flew his infected son to his safe zone in Florida against protocols that resulted in an outbreak there. Consumed by grief and humiliation, he commits suicide in his hotel room and is found by Kara Green and two Secret Service agents.  However, it was later revealed that President Michener was actually murdered as part of a planned coup d'état orchestrated by the regional leaders and his chief of staff, Allison Shaw.

In season 5, the newly-built USS Jeffrey Michener is named in his honor. Although it is damaged in the Fleet Week attack, the Michener survives and is mentioned to take part in the invasion of Gran Colombia, rescuing the survives of the Nathan James when the ship sinks.

In the series finale, President Michener briefly reappears when Chandler has a near-death experience along with everyone else Chandler has lost along the way following the sinking of the Nathan James. President Michener is on a TV presenting Chandler with an award while Tex Nolan tries to show Chandler how people see him and to convince Chandler to return to the land of the living.

Howard Oliver
The former Mayor of Saint Louis, who served as Vice President of the United States under President Jeffrey Michener. Upon Michener's death, Oliver cancelled short a diplomatic trip to South America and returned to the United States, where he was sworn in as President. Initially held up in a Costco, his effective leadership as Mayor during the Red Flu pandemic resulted in the St. Louis area having one of the lowest casualty rates in the country, and he became revered for inspiring hope in the people. He is later held hostage in the White House by Allison Shaw and members of the United States Secret Service loyal to her, forced to be a puppet for her and the regional leaders under threat of his family being executed. He is later rescued by the crew of the USS Nathan James, and operates in exile out of the office used by Michener aboard the ship for a brief period of time.

By season 5, three years later, he is no longer President, having been replaced by Joshua Reiss. Presumably, Oliver finished out his term and left office. The newly-built USS Howard Oliver is named in his honor and, although damaged in the Fleet Week attack, it survives to undergo repairs.

He is portrayed by John Cothran.

Allison Shaw
Allison Shaw is the former White House Chief of Staff, serving under President Michener and President Oliver. It is implied in the episode "Sea Change" that she was in a secret relationship with President Michener. Shaw reveals that she is the leader of the coup d'état against President Oliver in the episode "Paradise". As a component of the coup d'état, Shaw and four out of the five regional leaders authorized the murders of Secretary of Foreign Affairs Alex Rivera and the fifth regional leader, Senator William Beatty.  Shaw also authorized the murder of President Michener in the episode "In The Dark," with her Secret Service agents staging the scene to make it look like a suicide. Shaw is shot and killed by Captain Chandler during a moment of rage in the Season 3 finale "Don't Look Back" after he learns that she had his father killed, his children kidnapped, and the death of Tex at the hands of her men.

She is portrayed by Elisabeth Röhm.

Alex Rivera
Alex Rivera was the United States Secretary of Foreign Affairs under President Michener and briefly under President Oliver. Rivera and Senator William Beatty were shot and killed by order of Allison Shaw and the four remaining regional leaders in the Season 3 episode "Paradise."

He is portrayed by Nestor Serrano.

Ray Mabus
The real-life United States Secretary of the Navy, Ray Mabus, cameoed as himself in "It's Not a Rumor", issuing orders to the crew of the Nathan James via a recorded message; by the time the ship received the orders, Secretary Mabus had succumbed to the "Red Flu" virus.

Joshua Reiss
President Joshua Reiss succeeded Howard Oliver as the U.S. president. He is shown to be in office at the start of Season 5, three years after the events of the Red Rust in Season 4. When the newly christened United States Navy is attacked and partially destroyed at Naval Station Mayport in Florida, he persuades Congress to declare war on the newly reconstituted Gran Colombian Empire.

He is portrayed by Steven Culp.

Civilian relatives

Jed Chandler
Tom Chandler's Army veteran father who is seen in flashbacks and in the present. He and the family were holed up in the family cabin in Virginia and infected with the virus. He is later injected with the vaccine by his son, and now resides in the vaccinated city of Norfolk. In "Safe Zone", CDR Chandler mentions that his father is 68 years old and that he has a heart condition.  In "Don't Look Back", Jed is killed by Allison Shaw's (Elisabeth Röhm) people during the kidnapping of his grandchildren in an effort to blackmail CAPT Chandler.  He is portrayed by Bill Smitrovich.

Darien Chandler
Tom's wife who is seen in flashbacks and in the present. She and the family were holed up in the family cabin in Virginia and infected with the virus. She dies from the virus before CDR Chandler can save her.  She is portrayed by Tracy Middendorf.

Ashley Chandler
Tom's daughter who is seen in flashbacks and in the present.  She and the family were holed up in the family cabin and infected with the virus.  She is later injected with the vaccine by her father, and now resides in the vaccinated city of Norfolk with her grandfather.  She is portrayed by Grace Kaufman.

Sam Chandler
Tom's son who is seen in flashbacks and in the present.  He and the family were holed up in the family cabin and infected with the virus.  He is later injected with the vaccine by his father, and now resides in the vaccinated city of Norfolk with his grandfather.  He is portrayed by Aidan Sussman.

Kelly & Ava Tophet
Quincy Tophet's wife and daughter who are living in captivity on the Russian vessel RFS Vyerni. They are later rescued by the Nathan James, and departed the ship at Norfolk, where they now reside with the Chandler family.  Kelly is portrayed by Alice Coulthard and Ava is portrayed by Jade Pettyjohn.

Christine Slattery
Mike Slattery's wife who is seen in pictures and flashbacks. After her son Lucas's death, Christine and her two girls moved to the Deer Park safe camp but when Mike arrived, the place was found abandoned. She has been MIA since then. She is portrayed by Ele Keats.

Season 1 characters

Konstantin Ruskov
Admiral Konstantin Nikolajewitsch Ruskov (Russian: Константин Николaевич Русков) was an officer in the Russian Navy before the virus spread. He was the commanding officer of the RFS Vyerni, a Kirov-class battlecruiser, which was also out at sea when the virus spread, and was the last existing ship of the Russian Navy.  He died when the USS Nathan James (DDG-151) sunk his ship.  He was portrayed by Ravil Isyanov.

Season 1 & 2 characters
 Bertrise (Hope Olaide Wilson), a young Jamaican woman rescued by the Nathan James who has a genetic immunity to the virus. Her immunity proves a vital part in finding a cure and a vaccine for the virus.
 Niels Sørensen (Ebon Moss-Bachrach), aka "Patient Zero", the glory-seeking Norwegian scientist who unknowingly took advantage of his immunity by testing the virus on himself which made him a carrier and creates the current pandemic version of the virus in his effort to find the cure. Formerly a captive of Ruskov, then working with Sean Ramsey and the Immunes, even trying deliberately to infect others. He died on board the Nathan James after his immunity is removed by Dr. Scott and he is killed by the virus.
 Thorwald (Titus Welliver), a mysterious local warlord fighting underground.  He is revealed to be an ex-Baltimore Police Department detective fighting against the rogue government led by Amy Granderson, who is vaccinating select people and killing everyone else with a toxic dose which they claim is the vaccine, to be burnt to power up the city of Baltimore, Maryland, and is later killed in the raid on Granderson's headquarters.

Season 2 characters

Sean Ramsey
Lieutenant Commander Sean Ramsey is a former member of the Royal Navy who served as the leader of the Immunes and was the self-appointed commander of the former Royal Navy  HMS Achilles. In S02E05, Ramsey tells Niels Sørensen that he was submarine's coxswain, a position that is usually held by a senior chief petty officer,  prior to the pandemic killing the rest of the crew. He is presumably dead after HMS Achilles sank with him aboard. He is portrayed by Brían F. O'Byrne.

Ned Ramsey
The younger brother of Sean Ramsey and second-in-command of the Immunes. He previously served a Sub-Lieutenant aboard the Royal Navy  HMS Achilles, with he and his brother being the only two to survive when the submarine became infected with the Red Flu. Ned is killed when the Achilles is sunk by the Nathan James.

Valerie Raymond
A computer expert who sought refuge from the Red Flu outbreak on an oil rig off the coast of New Orleans. She created the Valkyrie Network, a system used by 6 million people which uses Bluetooth to enable global communication through an app called Dead Man. She is tricked to working with the Immunes by Sean Ramsey, allowing them exclusive use of the network to broadcast doctored video footage to survivors in the United States to turn their trust away from the crew of the USS Nathan James. It is mentioned she has a Masters in Computer Science from MIT and a PhD in Engineering Physics from Tulane University. Raymond is killed when her plane blows up in mid air. She is played by Tania Raymonde.

Season 3 characters

Peng Wu
The former Minister of State Security for China, Peng Wu becomes the President of the People's Republic of China after the crew of the USS Nathan James (DDG-151) created and spread the cure for the Red Flu.  Peng was the only survivor of the Chinese government, and it is rumored that he survived because he killed the rest of the Chinese leadership in the bunker they were sequestered in. He is intent on expanding the influence and control of the People's Republic of China after the Red Flu outbreak desiring to wipe out all other Asian peoples and cultures. To achieve this, he oversees the development and use of an anti-cure that prevents the Red Flu vaccine from working, committing genocide across Asia and wiping out both Japan and Vietnam. However, Peng's attempt to wipe out Korea is thwarted by the Nathan James. He is eventually killed by Takahaya while accompanying his men on a mission to destroy the National Archives of Japan in Tokyo. He is portrayed by Fernando Chien.

A former Captain in the Japanese Maritime Self-Defense Force, Kaito Takahaya became a pirate after the Red Flu outbreak. He and his group took members of the USS Nathan James (DDG-151) prisoner when his people begin to die after being administered the cure by US soldiers. The Nathan James eventually rescues their captured crewmembers and his wife Kyoko convinces Takehaya to surrender. On the Nathan James, his wife gives birth to a son that they name Kaito after his father and Chandler, as a fellow father, convinces Takehaya to allow them to give Kaito the cure. With it proving to be successful, Takehaya allies himself with the crew and explains that he blames himself for the destruction of his people as Takehaya and his men were the ones responsible for spreading the cure across Japan. It's eventually discovered that President Peng Wu of China has been spreading an anti-cure across Asia to commit genocide. While Kaito is safe, the anti-cure's effects are permanent and both Takehaya and Kyoko are doomed to perish of the Red Flu. Takehaya and his men coordinate with the Nathan James to foil Peng's plot, leading to a confrontation between Peng and Takehaya at the National Archives of Japan which Peng attempts to destroy. Takehaya kills Peng with a katana, avenging his people, while the rest of Peng's anti-cure is found and destroyed, preventing any further genocide.

With his mission completed, Takehaya and his wife stay behind at the Japanese National Archive to rebuild as the disease kills them, saying their people will raise their child. He is portrayed by Hiroyuki Sanada.

Lau Hu
The Chinese Minister of State Security, and the second in command to President Peng Wu. Highly trained in martial arts, he is eventually killed by Wolf in S03E08. He was portrayed by Stephen Oyoung.

Jacob Barnes
A journalist based in St. Louis, Missouri, who is intent on exposing and humiliating the Michener Administrations efforts to rebuild the country after the Red Flu pandemic. However, after discovering Allison Shaw's plans, he switches sides and joins forces with Kara Green. On a mission to rescue a captured President Howard Oliver from the new White House, he is captured by rogue United States Secret Service agents and is later executed. Portrayed by: Devon Gummersall.

Jesse
An off-the-grid helicopter pilot who is a former acquaintance of Sasha Cooper. She is portrayed by Dichen Lachman. A pilot working for Doctors Without Borders, Jesse smuggles in supplies with Sasha's help until Jesse and her friends witness the People's Liberation Army led by Lau Hu moving missiles while in Guangzhou. Jesse escapes, but her friends and brother are killed. Jesse joins the Nathan James crew, aiding in the rescue of the captured crewmembers and in their fight against Peng Wu. After the Nathan James recovers one of Peng's anti-cure missiles, Jesse recognizes it as being identical to the ones that she saw being moved in Guangzhou shortly before Vietnam was wiped out by the Red Flu. Jesse leaves the Nathan James after Peng is defeated and they head back to America to continue her mission of spreading the cure.

Kyoko
The pregnant wife of Takahaya. She is portrayed by Ayako Fujitani. After a number of the Nathan James crew is captured, she is treated for malaria by Doc Rios and she convinces her husband to surrender to the Americans. On the Nathan James, Kyoko undergoes an emergency caesarean section to successfully deliver her son Kaito who is inoculated against the Red Flu. While delirious from her fever, Kyoko mentions seeing a strange green mist in the night over Japan which proves to be Peng Wu's anti-cure. Doc Rios determines that, due to the anti-cure in their systems, both Takehaya and Kyoko are terminally ill with the Red Flu and, ultimately, they can't be saved. After Peng is killed, Kyoko chooses to return to Japan to die with her husband on their home soil, knowing that their people will take care of Kaito when they're gone.

Dennis
A computer and communications technician who works at the new White House in St. Louis, Missouri. Played by Drew Fonteiro

Toshiro
A Japanese pirate and Takehaya's second-in-command. Killed by Doc Rios when the captured crew members were rescued. He is played by Eidan Hanzei.

Manuel Castillo
The regional leader of the Pacific Southwest, based out of California. He is the only Hispanic member of the regional leaders, and previously worked in the luxury car business before the Red Flu outbreak. When the United States government is dissolved, he becomes Commander-in-chief of the 'California United Forces', consisting of members of the United States Military stationed in his jurisdiction. His relationship with the other regional leaders becomes soured when he demands that he also be given control over the Pacific Northwest, which has been ungoverned since they orchestrated the death of William Beatty. He is later captured and arrested by Captain Chandler and the crew of the USS Nathan James at Naval Base San Diego, with the US soldiers under his command reaffirming their allegiance to President Howard Oliver. He is portrayed by Al Coronel.

Roberta Price (née Hearst)
The regional leader of the Deep South. The only female member of the regional leaders, she is both the smartest and the most ruthless. She and her people operate out of a large ranch in Texarkana, Texas. She controls several large power plants that provide electricity to other areas of the country, but relies on manpower transported from other regional areas to man them. Her region also has access to many large reserves of crude oil. After being used to unlock the United States new centralized weapons control system, she is killed by a United States Secret Service agent on the orders of Allison Shaw. She is portrayed by Lucy Butler.

Albert Wilson
The regional leader of the Midwest. He operates out of a large mansion and farm fifty miles outside of Des Moines, Iowa. He previously worked as a stockbroker in Omaha. The area of St. Louis, Missouri (where the new White House is located) is technically under his jurisdiction, but Allison Shaw later conspires with Roberta Price to convince him to hand it over to her, so it can become an independent federal district under her control. He is captured by Green and Miller in S03E12. He is portrayed by Dougald Park.

Randall Croft
The regional leader of the East Coast, based out of a recovering New York City. He lives in a large penthouse on Park Avenue, and is noted to have a drinking problem. He assists Allison Shaw in activating the United States centralised weapons system, wanting to be the one to destroy the USS Nathan James and kill Tom Chandler. He is later tased and captured by Slattery and Taylor after leaving a bar on the Upper West Side. He is portrayed by Eddie Driscoll.

Senator William Beatty
The regional leader of the Pacific Northwest. He is the only member of the regional leaders with extensive political experience, having served as a United States senator for Washington before the outbreak. Eventually, he no longer wants to continue with the plot of overthrowing the federal government and he is killed by order of Allison Shaw in S03E09. Portrayed by: H. Richard Greene.

Season 4 characters

James Fletcher
Commander James Fletcher is a MI6 intelligence officer and a member of the Royal Navy. He has past personal and professional experience with Sasha Cooper, and joins the team aboard the USS Nathan James between the events of Season 3 and 4. He later receives orders from the UK government and Captain Harry Sinclair to steal the seeds, with the British government having made a deal with Paul Vellek and betray the American government. He reluctantly goes ahead with the plan, revealing the ship's location to the Vellek family and killing a Master-at-arms before escaping. After learning about Vellek's plan to dose people with the Nostos drug, he realises the error of his ways. Fletcher manages to broadcast a message to the Nathan James warning of Vellek's plot and apologizing for his actions before he is discovered and shot to death by Giorgio Vellek. He is portrayed by Jonathan Howard.

Harry Sinclair
Captain Harry Sinclair is a MI6 intelligence officer who previously served with James Fletcher. He boards the USS Nathan James under the guise of a Middle Eastern refugee, and informs Fletcher that the UK government has deal with Paul Vellek, and they are to steal the seeds from the Americans. He harbors a great deal of resentment towards the United States, revealing people in the UK were ravaged by anarchy and chaos (he personally had to resort to eating dog meat) during the Immune Wars whilst waiting for the cure for the Red Flu to be delivered by the United States, and are now starving due to the Red Rust. He kills several sailors aboard the Nathan James in the process of retrieving the seeds, including O'Connor, but is fatally shot by Tom Chandler. He is portrayed by George Georgiou.

Omar Bin Dalik
An Algerian terrorist of Tuareg descent, who holds considerable influence over areas of North Africa. After he and his people raid a seed bank, they come into possession of a rare variety of palm seeds, the only known species to be immune to the effects of the Red Rust, a variant of the Red Flu that ravages the worlds crops and plants. He and his group are based in the El-Hamri District of Oran. He is shot by Giorgio Vellek and presumed dead, but is later revealed to be alive when he attacks Giorgio's mansion on Atokos island. He is killed by an explosion triggered by Lt. Carlton Burk during his attack on the mansion. He is portrayed by Anthony Azizi.

Ares
A Greek fighter working for Giorgio Vellek. Before the arrival of Tom Chandler, known to everyone else as Hercules, Ares was the reigning champion. Chandler defeated Ares and took his spot as the champion. Ares later becomes a test subject for the Nostos drug, as seen in a video recovered from Giorgio's mansion by the Nathan James. While looking for clues to the location of Dr. Paul Vellek's lab in an old prison on Kelos, Danny Green recognizes Ares and approaches him for information. Due to the Nostos drug, Ares has lost his will to fight and is placid, but he expresses relief at Chandler managing to escape the same fate. Ares reveals that the Nostos is in the food being served to the prisoners. Though given a chance to escape on the Nathan James, Ares chooses to sacrifice himself so that the team can get away. Unable to fight due to the Nostos, Ares stands in between the guards and the Americans, resulting in Ares getting shot to death. With his last words, he requests Green to tell Chandler to keep fighting. He is portrayed by John Hennigan.

Dr. Paul Antonio Vellek
A skilled scientist regarded as one of fathers of modern bio-infomatics and computational biology. However, his obsessive desires to reshape human evolution led to him being classed as "ethically dangerous" by the National Security Agency and he displays many signs of insanity. He was indicted, but fled the United States to Greece. In the aftermath of the Red Flu, he works towards engineering crops resistant to its successor, the Red Rust. He controls a large army of fighters, in addition to remnants of the Hellenic Navy, including Hydra class frigate HS Triton, where his laboratory is located. It is later revealed he plans on synthesising a drug from the mutated Nostros weed (which acts as an inhibitor to the brain's stress and aggression positive feedback group, rendering those affected by it docile and unable to fight), and use it in conjunction with controlling the food supply with the cure for the Red Rust, essentially giving Vellek control of the world. He further plans to dose the healthy crops with the Nostros drug, allowing him to control the majority of the population, who will have no choice but to eat the food or starve. Born in Minnesota, he is the father of Giorgio and Lucia. He frequently hallucinates and speaks to his youngest son, Christos, who was killed in a violent mugging years prior, drinking diluted Nostros tea to maintain the illusions. After the crew of the USS Nathan James foil his plans, he kills himself by jumping off the HS Triton. However, the crew is able to recover the seeds and salvage much of his research, allowing them to replicate and spread Vellek's cure to the Red Rust. He is portrayed by Peter Weller.

Giorgio Adonis Vellek
A Greek-American crime lord who controls of many Greek islands in the Mediterranean, extorting the local farmers and fisherman. He organises gambling fight clubs, which keep people entertained and prevent them from going against him. His base is a mansion on Atokos island. He liaises with remnants of the Hellenic Navy in order to find men to fight on his behalf. He later recruits Tom Chandler to work for him as a fighter, not knowing his true identity. He was raised in Iowa, and is the son of Dr. Paul Vellek, the primary antagonist of Season 4. When the USS Nathan James attacks and sinks the HS Proteus, Giorgio is killed by flying shrapnel, dying in his sister's arms. He is portrayed by Jackson Rathbone.

Lucia Katarina Vellek
The sister of Giorgio, who retains a significant level of control in his criminal enterprises. She is the cooler headed of the two, regarding her brother's passion for making men fight as childish. After her brother recruits Tom Chandler as a fighter, she enters into a brief sexual relationship with him. However, after his true identity is revealed, she develops a personal vendetta against him. Like her brother, she is also Greek-American. She is shot and killed aboard the HS Triton by Sasha Cooper. She is portrayed by Sibylla Deen.

Christos Vellek
The son of Dr. Paul Vellek and the older brother of Giorgio and Lucia. Of the three, he is Vellek's favored child and he is often seen conversing with him while ignoring his other children. It's eventually revealed that Christos is actually dead, having been beaten to death years before the Red Flu pandemic during a violent mugging. The Christos that Vellek sees is a hallucination brought on by his insanity and his use of the drug Nostos which Vellek takes heavily in order to be able to hallucinate Christos. He is portrayed by Drew Roy.

Stavros Diomedes
Commander Stavros Diomedes is a member of the Hellenic Navy allied with the Vellek family. He commands the Hydra class frigate HS Proteus, which is used by the Vellek family in their exploits, in addition to helping Giorgio Vellek scout for new fighters for his fight clubs run on islands in the Mediterranean. He is later promoted to Admiral and placed in charge of the navy after Paul Vellek spikes Admiral Demetrius with a concentrated form of the Nostros weed, rendering him docile. When the HS Proteus is destroyed, he takes control of the HS Triton alongside Captain Maroudiss. After the Triton is sabotaged by Tom Chandler and Sasha Cooper, he begins shooting at the USS Nathan James with an M2 Browning machine gun. Lieutenant Commander Kara Green returns fire with the Nathan James weapons, killing Stavros in the process. He is portrayed by Christos Vasilopoulos.

Demetrius
Admiral Demetrius is the head of the Hellenic Navy. He is high up within the national leadership of Greece in Athens, referring to himself as the 'leader of the Hellenic City State'. He is closely allied with Paul Vellek and his family, providing them with man and fire power in exchange for his country to be the first to benefit from the cure for the Red Rust. This includes a fleet of four Hydra class warships: the HS Proteus, HS Nereus, HS Demeter and HS Triton. Upon discovering Vellek has made a similar deal with the United Kingdom, he becomes enraged and threatens the family. This results in Vellek spiking him with a concentrated version of the Nostros weed, rendering him docile and unable to fight, with his rank and power being transferred to Commander Stavros Deomides. He is later killed by James Fletcher with a cyanide capsule in an effort to disrupt Vellek's experiments. Before he is killed Demetrius tells Fletcher that he'd rather be dead than alive in his current state, making his death in effect an act of euthanasia. Demetrius' death and the subsequent investigation into it gives Fletcher time to contact the Nathan James and warn them about Vellek's plans. However, Vellek quickly discovers the truth in an autopsy and Fletcher is killed for his betrayal. He is portrayed by Costas Mandylor.

Season 5 characters

Gustavo Barros
Gustavo Barros, commonly known by his nickname Tavo, is the leader of the newly reconstituted Gran Colombian Empire, a superstate that controls multiple nations in South America. Highly critical of how his people have been treated by the United States in the past, he plans to unify South America to undermine the United States and take its place as a great power on the recovering, post pandemic world stage. Presenting himself as a "man of the people" he enjoys widespread support across the continent. However, his critics compare him to Pablo Escobar, arguing he does just enough public good to distract the people from his true intentions. He has the democratically elected President of Panama assassinated, causing a power vacuum that allows his empire to take control of the country and therefore the Panama Canal. He also attempts to pressure Mexico into voluntarily joining the Empire, or be forcefully occupied instead. During a final confrontation with the American forces, his defeated army surrenders. When confronted by Danny Green and Sasha Cooper, he agrees to only surrender to Tom Chandler, "soldier to soldier." After Barros reached for a gun, he was shot dead by Green and Cooper in self-defense. He is played by Maurice Compte.

Hector Martinez
Hector Martinez is a high-ranking officer in the Gran Colombian Army who serves as right-hand man to Gustavo Barros. He is played by Rigo Sanchez.

Conchita Barros
Conchita Barros is Gustavo's ambitious wife. She pushes Gustavo to go after the Nathan James. She is played by Cindy Luna.

References

The Last Ship (TV series)